The Compulsory Rotating Medical Internship (CRMI) refers to one year of compulsory work in hospitals attached to a medical college or in any other approved teaching hospital before becoming qualified to practice as an independent doctor or dentist. As stipulated by the National Medical Commission, the CRMI is essential for the award of the MBBS degree and full NMC registration as a physician. For dentists, the CRMI is regulated by the Dental Council of India.

Description 
An intern (also called an Internee or CRMI) is posted in all the clinical departments of the hospital on a rotational basis. This gives them the basic clinical exposure to all the specialties. For CRMI completion, interns are assigned a list of procedures that they must perform and observe.

The intern is given a monthly stipend. The amount is dependent on university and state policies. Completion of an internship is a necessary prerequisite for acquiring a license to practice medicine, postgraduate studies, and higher specialty training.

On passing the final MBBS/BDS examination at the end of 4.5 years, a medical/dental student is first awarded a Provisional Registration certificate by the National Medical Commission or Dental Council of India. Permanent Registration certificate along with the "NMC/DCI Registration number" and the final medical/dental degree is given only after obtaining a CRMI Completion Certificate endorsing the successful and satisfactory completion of CRMI requirements.

Comparison 
This internship is different from the United Kingdom's system of foundation doctors, in which the transition period from medical school to general practice is not required. Unlike a house physician/surgeon, interns are provided a stipend based on university and state policies, as opposed to monthly salaries. The American counterpart is conducted within a specific medical specialty and is called a "resident" or a "resident doctor" (i.e., a resident physician or a resident surgeon, etc.). In some countries, they are also called a "senior house officer".

Post-internship, a MBBS graduate can practice medicine independently in India. The National Medical Commission and National Board of Examinations (NBE) approves MD, MS, DM, MCh, and DNB post-graduate degrees. In comparison, MD graduates in the US must pursue a fellowship after their multi-year residency before they can independently practice a sub-specialty.

Responsibilities 

Interns are entrusted with clinical responsibilities under the supervision of an experienced clinician. They do not work independently but can treat patients. Interns cannot issue medical certificates, death certificates, or medico-legal documents under their own signatures since they lack a MCI registration number.

MBBS graduates that studied abroad in institutions affected by the COVID-19 pandemic and 2022 Russian invasion of Ukraine are required to undergo two years of CRMI to ensure full clinical exposure.

See also 
 Bachelor of Medicine and Surgery
 Bachelor of Dental Surgery
 Medical College (India)
 List of dental colleges in India
 Medical school
 Medical education

References

External links 
 National Medical Commission
 FAQ on Compulsory Rotating Medical Internship Regulations
 Educational Commission for Foreign Medical Graduates

Medical education in India